Bernadeth Pons (born October 19, 1996) is a Filipino indoor and beach volleyball athlete. She played for Petron Tri-Activ Spikers as an outside hitter.

Personal life
Pons is the eldest in three siblings. She finished with a degree of BS Financial Management at Far Eastern University.

Career
Pons played with Rafael B Lacson National High School, Western Visayas Regional Athletic Association and the Far Eastern University. She played with Petron Tri-Activ Spikers, winning the 2016 Philippine Super Liga All-Filipino Second Best Outside Spiker award.

In the 2017 season of the Philippine SuperLiga, Pons and Cherry Rondina of Petron Sprint 4T won the championship of the Beach Challenge Cup. With the Petron Blaze Spikers, she won the Invitational Cup silver medal, All-Filipino Conference gold medal and the Grand Prix Conference silver medal.
She became a team captain of FEU Lady Tamaraws during the UAAP Season 80 and she led the team in first finals appearance since UAAP Season 71. They finished as a runner-up after they lost in DLSU Lady Spikers in best-of-three finals.

Awards

Individuals
 2016 Philippine Super Liga All-Filipino "2nd Best Outside Spiker"

Collegiate
 2014 UAAP Season 76 volleyball tournaments - 5th placer, with Far Eastern University Lady Tamaraws
 2015 UAAP Season 77 volleyball tournaments - 4th placer, with Far Eastern University Lady Tamaraws
 2015 UAAP Season 78 beach volleyball tournaments -  Silver medal, with Far Eastern University Lady Tamaraws
 2016 UAAP Season 78 volleyball tournaments -  Bronze medal, with Far Eastern University Lady Tamaraws
 2016 UAAP Season 79 beach volleyball tournaments -  Silver medal, with Far Eastern University Lady Tamaraws
 2017 UAAP Season 79 volleyball tournaments - 4th placer, with Far Eastern University Lady Tamaraws
 2017 UAAP Season 80 beach volleyball tournaments -  Silver medal, with Far Eastern University Lady Tamaraws
 2018 UAAP Season 80 volleyball tournaments –  Silver medal, with Far Eastern University Lady Tamaraws

Clubs
 2017 Belo Philippine SuperLiga Beach Volleyball Challenge Cup –  Champion, with Petron Sprint 4T
 2017 Belo Philippine SuperLiga Invitational Cup –  Silver medal, with Petron Blaze Spikers
 2017 Rebisco Philippine SuperLiga All-Filipino Conference –  Champion, with Petron Blaze Spikers
 2017 Chooks-To-Go Philippine SuperLiga Grand Prix –  Silver medal, with Petron Blaze Spikers
 2018 Chooks-To-Go Philippine SuperLiga Beach Volleyball Challenge Cup –  Champion, with Petron XCS

References

Filipino women's volleyball players
Living people
Far Eastern University alumni
University Athletic Association of the Philippines volleyball players
1996 births
Sportspeople from Negros Occidental
Wing spikers
Competitors at the 2019 Southeast Asian Games
Southeast Asian Games bronze medalists for the Philippines
Southeast Asian Games medalists in volleyball
Filipino women's beach volleyball players
Competitors at the 2021 Southeast Asian Games
21st-century Filipino women
Outside hitters